Eta Leporis, Latinised from η Leporis, is a single, yellow-white-hued star in the southern constellation of Lepus, the hare. It is visible to the naked eye with an apparent visual magnitude of approximately 3.72. The annual parallax shift of 67.21 mas yields a distance estimate of 49 light-years. It is moving closer to the Sun with a radial velocity of −1.6 km/s.

This is an ordinary F-type main-sequence star with a stellar classification of F2 V. It is about 1.8 billion years old and spinning with a projected rotational velocity of 26 km/s. The star has 1.4 times the mass of the Sun and 1.5 times the Sun's radius. Using the IRS instrument on the Spitzer Space Telescope, excess infrared emission has been observed from the star, which can be modeled by a dust disk extending from 1 to 16 astronomical units from Eta Leporis.

References

F-type main-sequence stars
Circumstellar disks
Lepus (constellation)
Leporis, Eta
Durchmusterung objects
0225
Leporis, 16
040136
028103
2085